Antal Hetényi (6 October 1947 – 5 March 2023) was a Hungarian judoka. He competed in the men's half-middleweight event at the 1972 Summer Olympics.

Hetényi died on 5 March 2023, at the age of 75.

References

1947 births
2023 deaths
Hungarian male judoka
Olympic judoka of Hungary
Judoka at the 1972 Summer Olympics
Martial artists from Budapest
20th-century Hungarian people